Henry Babcock ( – ) was a colonial American military officer.  

He was a son of Chief Justice Joshua Babcock, of Rhode Island, graduated from Yale College in 1752, entered the army, became a captain at eighteen years of age, and at nineteen served under Col. Ephraim Williams at the Battle of Lake George. He was major in 1756, lieutenant-colonel in 1757, and in 1758 colonel of a Rhode Island regiment that took part in the unsuccessful attempt to capture Ticonderoga. Here he was wounded in the knee. He was afterward present at the capture of the place by Sir Jeffrey Amherst, in 1759. He settled at Stonington, Connecticut, and in February, 1776, was made commander of the troops at Newport, R.I., but in May was removed on account of insanity. 

Henry Babcock died on 7 October 1800 in Stonington.

References 

Created via preloaddraft
1736 births
1800 deaths